The 2023 NASCAR Craftsman Truck Series is the 29th season of the NASCAR Craftsman Truck Series, a stock car racing series sanctioned by NASCAR in the United States. The season started with the NextEra Energy 250 on February 17 at Daytona International Speedway, and will end with the NASCAR Craftsman Truck Series Championship Race on November 3 at Phoenix Raceway.

This is the first season of the Truck Series with Craftsman as the title sponsor since 2008. Camping World, the title sponsor of the series from 2009 to 2022, did not renew their title sponsorship of the series and Craftsman returned as the title sponsor, although the tool company is now owned by Stanley Black & Decker instead of Sears, who owned Craftsman when they were the series title sponsor from 1995 to 2008.

Zane Smith entered the season as the defending champion, returning to the Front Row Motorsports No. 38 truck full-time in 2023 seeking to win a second consecutive championship.

This is also the first season in series history where two drivers with the exact same first and last name who are not related to each other competed together in a Truck Series race. Jason White from Virginia and Jason White from British Columbia, Canada raced against each other in the season-opener at Daytona with the American Jason White driving the No. 1 truck for TRICON Garage in his first Truck Series start since 2014 and the Canadian Jason White driving the No. 34 truck for Reaume Brothers Racing. NASCAR distinguished the two of them on the entry list and race results by using their middle initials.

Teams and drivers

Complete schedule

Limited schedule

Notes

Changes

Teams
 On October 1, 2022, Bret Holmes stated in his post-race interview after the 2022 Chevrolet Silverado 250 that he and his team would like to run full-time in the Truck Series in 2023. On February 3, 2023, Holmes officially announced that he and his team would run full-time in 2023.
 On October 5, 2022, Kelly Crandall from RACER Magazine reported that David Gilliland Racing would field four full-time trucks in 2023 after a manufacturer switch from Ford to Toyota. DGR fielded three full-time trucks in 2022. The fourth truck would be for a rotation of Toyota development drivers. Toyota's development drivers have driven part-time in the Kyle Busch Motorsports No. 51 truck for several years, but KBM will switch from Toyota to Chevrolet in 2023 as a result of Kyle Busch's move from Joe Gibbs Racing to Richard Childress Racing in the Cup Series. On October 27, DGR officially announced their 2023 plans which included everything Crandall reported except for that the fourth truck for the development drivers (the No. 1) would be fielded part-time instead of full-time and that the team would also change its name to TRICON Garage. On December 5, TRICON announced that they would be adding a fourth full-time truck, the No. 5, making the part-time No. 1 truck a fifth truck for the team. Hill Motorsports, which used the No. 5 in 2022 for a second part-time truck for the team driven by Tyler Hill, will be giving up the number to TRICON. On January 17, 2023, Hill Motorsports announced that they would not field a part-time second truck in 2023 with a different number.
 On October 25, 2022, GMS Racing announced that they would be fielding a third full-time truck, the No. 43, driven by Daniel Dye. Team President Mike Beam stated that the team would be expanding their Truck Series program although the number of trucks the team will field in 2023 was not specified. Reaume Brothers Racing, which used the No. 43 in 2022, will be giving up the number to GMS. The team revealed on January 24, 2023 that they would renumber their No. 43 truck to the No. 34 (the number of that truck in 2021).
 On November 4, 2022, Kyle Busch Motorsports announced it would downsize from three truck teams to two in 2023: the No. 4 and the No. 51.
 On November 4, 2022, ARCA Menards Series team Rev Racing announced that they would expand into the Truck Series, fielding one full-time truck, the No. 2 driven by 2022 main ARCA Series champion Nick Sanchez, in an alliance with Kyle Busch Motorsports.
 On January 16, 2023, it was revealed that Hattori Racing Enterprises would only field one full-time truck in 2023, the No. 16 driven by Tyler Ankrum. The No. 61 truck, previously driven by Chase Purdy (who left to drive the KBM No. 4 truck), will only be fielded part-time in 2023. The driver lineup and which races it will be entered in have yet to be determined. On March 17, 2023, Hattori announced that Christopher Bell would drive the 61 truck in the race at North Wilkesboro Speedway, making his first truck series start since 2018.

Drivers
 On October 5, 2022, it was announced that Chandler Smith, who drove the Kyle Busch Motorsports No. 18 truck full-time in 2021 and 2022, would leave to move up to the Xfinity Series full-time in 2023 to drive the Kaulig Racing No. 16 car (replacing A. J. Allmendinger, who would return to the Cup Series full-time in 2023 driving Kaulig's No. 16 Cup car).
 On October 5, 2022, Kelly Crandall from RACER Magazine reported that Corey Heim would move from Kyle Busch Motorsports, where he drove their No. 51 truck part-time in 2022, to David Gilliland Racing to run full-time in one of their trucks in 2023. DGR would also switch from Ford to Toyota and Heim would remain in Toyota's driver development system after KBM's switch from Toyota to Chevrolet. On October 27, 2022, DGR, which also announced its name change to TRICON Garage for 2023, officially announced that Heim would drive for the team full-time in their new No. 11 truck.
 On October 10, 2022, Chris Knight from Catchfence reported that 2022 ARCA Menards Series champion Nick Sanchez would likely drive for a Chevrolet team in the Truck Series in 2023. It would be Sanchez's debut in the Truck Series. On November 4, it was announced that Sanchez would drive full-time for Rev Racing (his ARCA team) which would expand into the Truck Series in 2023.
 On October 10, 2022, NASCAR Whelen Euro Series driver Thomas Krasonis announced that he would make his Truck Series debut in 2023. The team he will drive for has yet to be announced. He would be the first driver from Greece to compete in the series.
 On October 18, 2022, it was announced that Chase Purdy would not return to the Hattori Racing Enterprises No. 61 truck in 2023. On November 4, it was announced that Purdy would drive the No. 4 truck for Kyle Busch Motorsports in 2023, replacing John Hunter Nemechek.
 On October 25, 2022, GMS Racing announced that Daniel Dye, who drove for the team full-time in the main ARCA Series in 2022, would move up to the Truck Series full-time in 2023 for the team. He will drive a new third GMS truck, the No. 43, the same number he used for them in ARCA as well as Ben Kennedy Racing and in late model racing. The season-opener at Daytona was Dye's Truck Series debut.
 On October 27, 2022, David Gilliland Racing, which announced it would rename to TRICON Garage, announced that Taylor Gray would drive their No. 17 truck full-time in 2023 except for the first three races due to his 18th birthday not being until March 25. The first three races are at tracks where 17-year-old drivers cannot compete at as per NASCAR's age restriction policy. Gray drove the No. 17 truck part-time in 2021 and 2022.
 On October 27, 2022, it was announced that the David Gilliland Racing (TRICON Garage starting in 2023) No. 1 truck, which was driven full-time by Hailie Deegan in 2022, would become a part-time truck for the team in 2023 and would be driven by Toyota Racing Development drivers as part of the team's switch from Ford to Toyota. Deegan will not return to the rebranded team in 2023 as she has a contract with Ford as one of their development drivers. On January 19, 2023, TRICON announced that William Sawalich, the new driver of Joe Gibbs Racing's No. 18 ARCA car, would drive the No. 1 truck part-time in 2023.
 On November 4, 2022, Kyle Busch Motorsports announced that Jack Wood, who drove the No. 24 truck for GMS Racing full-time in 2022, would drive part-time in the team's No. 51 truck in 2023, sharing it with team owner Kyle Busch as well as other drivers to be named at a later time. On March 9, 2023, KBM announced that Hendrick Motorsports Cup Series driver William Byron would drive their No. 51 truck in three races. Byron drove full-time for the team in 2016 and is able to return to the team now that they switched to Chevrolet, which is Hendrick's manufacturer.
 On November 30, 2022, Colby Howard revealed to Joseph Srigley from TobyChristie.com that he would not return to the No. 91 truck for McAnally-Hilgemann Racing in 2023. He did get another full-time ride in the Truck Series with another team but did not announce which team it is. On February 7, 2023, it was announced that Howard would return to CR7 Motorsports to drive their No. 9 truck full-time in 2023, replacing Blaine Perkins, who moved up to the Xfinity Series full-time in 2023 driving the No. 07 car for SS-Green Light Racing. Howard drove the same truck part-time in 2021.
 On December 1, 2022, TobyChristie.com reported that Rajah Caruth would drive the No. 24 truck for GMS Racing in 2023, replacing Jack Wood, who left to drive the Kyle Busch Motorsports No. 51 truck part-time. It will be his first full-time season in the Truck Series. In 2022, Caruth drove part-time in the Truck Series in the No. 7 for Spire Motorsports, part-time in the Xfinity Series for Alpha Prime Racing and full-time in the ARCA Menards Series for Rev Racing.
 On December 5, 2022, TRICON Garage announced that Dean Thompson would drive for the team in 2023 in their new No. 5 truck. Thompson drove the No. 40 truck full-time for Niece Motorsports in 2022. Thompson was not replaced as Niece would cut back to three full-time trucks in 2023, with the No. 40 truck not being one of them.
 On December 6, 2022, McAnally-Hilgemann Racing announced that Christian Eckes, who previously drove the No. 98 truck for ThorSport Racing, would drive their No. 19 truck full-time in 2023, replacing Derek Kraus, and Jake Garcia, who drove part-time for the team in 2022, would drive their No. 35 truck in every race except the season-opener at Daytona due to his 18th birthday not coming until after that race.
 On December 6, 2022, Bob Pockrass from Fox reported that Hailie Deegan may replace Christian Eckes in ThorSport Racing's No. 98 truck in 2023. Eckes left the team to drive the No. 19 truck for McAnally-Hilgemann Racing. If this happens, ThorSport would also switch from Toyota back to Ford, their manufacturer from 2018 to 2020, as Deegan has a contract as a Ford development driver. Deegan lost her ride with David Gilliland Racing when that team (which renamed to TRICON Garage) switched from Ford to Toyota for 2023. On December 15, 2022, ThorSport Racing officially announced that Deegan would drive for them in 2023, replacing Eckes as a full-time driver on the team, but she would drive their No. 13 truck (which ran part-time in 2022 with Johnny Sauter) instead of the No. 98.
 On January 10, 2023, AM Racing announced that Christian Rose would drive full-time for the team in the main ARCA Series in 2023 in their No. 32 car as well as run part-time in the Truck Series for the team. It will be Rose's debut in the Truck Series. It has not been announced if he will run his part-time schedule in the team's full-time No. 22 truck or in a part-time second truck (which has previously been the No. 37) for the team.
 On January 17, 2023, it was announced that Ryan Vargas would drive the No. 30 truck for On Point Motorsports part-time in 2023 starting at Atlanta. Despite having competed in the Xfinity Series since 2019, it will be Vargas' Truck Series debut.
 On January 24, 2023, Reaume Brothers Racing announced that Mason Massey would drive full-time for them in 2023 in their No. 33 truck. In 2022, Massey drove all but six races in the DGM Racing No. 91 car in the Xfinity Series. He also drove part-time for RBR in the Truck Series in 2019. It is the first time RBR has ever had one driver run the full season in one of their trucks.
 On January 31, 2023, Roper Racing announced that Kaden Honeycutt would drive their No. 04 truck in the first six races of the season. Honeycutt ran part-time in the Truck Series for G2G Racing and On Point Motorsports in 2022.
 On February 1, 2023, it was announced that Derek Kraus, who lost his full-time ride in the McAnally-Hilgemann No. 19 truck to Christian Eckes for 2023, would drive the Young's Motorsports No. 20 truck in the season-opener at Daytona. He could run more races for the team if sponsorship is found. On March 11, it was announced that IndyCar driver Ed Jones would drive the No. 20 truck at COTA. It will be his debut in NASCAR and the Truck Series.
 On January 28, 2023, Dale Quarterley announced that he would attempt to qualify for the race at COTA after buying an old Toyota from Kyle Busch Motorsports, which switched to Chevrolet for 2023. He stated in an interview with Frontstretch that the plan is to drive for his own team, 1/4 Ley Racing, which he has fielded in ARCA although it is possible that he could partner with another team with owner points to have a better chance of qualifying for the race. It would be his and his team's debut in the Truck Series. On February 2, Tim Viens, the owner of G2G Racing, announced in an interview with TobyChristie.com that Quarterley would drive for his team in that race.
 On February 2, 2023, Tim Viens, the owner of G2G Racing, announced in an interview with TobyChristie.com that Memphis Villareal would run seven races (the only one that has been announced so far is COTA) for his team in 2023, making his debut in NASCAR and Truck Series. Additionally, Viens announced that B. J. McLeod and Brennan Poole would drive for G2G at Las Vegas and Atlanta with one driver in the No. 46 truck and the other in the No. 47. Although Poole would drive the No. 46 at Las Vegas, the No. 47 truck was not entered into either race with McLeod and Poole was replaced by Akinori Ogata in the No. 46 for Atlanta.
 On February 13, 2023, it was announced that Conner Jones would drive part-time for ThorSport Racing in 2023 in their No. 66 truck with Ty Majeski now driving the No. 98 truck full-time. Jones competed part-time in ARCA for Venturini Motorsports in 2022 and is doing so again in 2023 despite Venturini being a Toyota team and ThorSport now being a Ford team.
 On February 14, 2023, Johnny Sauter was replaced by Norm Benning in the No. 46 G2G Racing truck on the entry list for the season-opener at Daytona. The reason for the driver change is unknown.

Crew chiefs
 On November 9, 2022, Kyle Busch Motorsports announced that Brian Pattie would be the new crew chief of the No. 51 truck in 2023. Pattie previously worked for JTG Daugherty Racing as the crew chief of Ricky Stenhouse Jr.'s No. 47 car in the Cup Series. He replaces Mardy Lindley, who was announced on November 17 to be moving to JR Motorsports to crew chief Sam Mayer's No. 1 car in the Xfinity Series in 2023.
 On November 14, 2022, Scott Zipadelli announced his departure as crew chief of the Hattori Racing Enterprises No. 16. He served as the truck's crew chief for six seasons and won one championship with Brett Moffitt in 2018. On January 13, 2023, Hattori announced that Doug Randolph would replace Zipadelli as crew chief of Ankrum's No. 16 truck. He previously was the crew chief of the No. 68 Brandonbilt Motorsports car in the Xfinity Series and prior to that was a crew chief in the Truck Series for Brad Keselowski Racing and GMS Racing.
 On December 6, 2022, it was announced that Chad Walter, who was the crew chief of the No. 27 Our Motorsports car driven by Jeb Burton in 2022, would be leaving for GMS Racing to crew chief the team's No. 24 truck driven by Rajah Caruth in the Truck Series in 2023. Walter is returning to GMS after having crew chiefed for the team in 2020 and 2021. He replaces Tom Ackerman, whose 2023 plans have yet to be announced.
 On December 6, 2022, GMS Racing announced that Travis Sharpe would be the crew chief for their new No. 43 truck driven by Daniel Dye in 2023. Sharpe previously worked for Bill McAnally Racing (whose Truck Series affiliate, McAnally-Hilgemann Racing, has had an alliance with GMS since 2022) and won the 2021 ARCA Menards Series West championship with Jesse Love. He has also crew chiefed Dye in late model racing.
 On December 7, 2022, Kyle Busch Motorsports announced that Jimmy Villeneuve would be the crew chief of their No. 4 truck driven by Chase Purdy in 2023, replacing Eric Phillips. He had been a truck chief for the team since 2017 and prior to that was a crew chief in the Truck Series for John Wes Townley's Athenian Motorsports No. 05 truck in 2016. On January 17, 2023, it was announced that Phillips would join Cup Series team 23XI Racing as the crew chief for their new part-time No. 67 car driven by Travis Pastrana in the 2023 Daytona 500.
 On December 7, 2022, it was announced that Danny Stockman Jr, who was the crew chief of the No. 18 truck for Kyle Busch Motorsports (which closed down in 2023) driven by Chandler Smith in 2022, would move to Rev Racing to crew chief their new Truck Series team which has an alliance with KBM. He will crew chief the No. 2 truck driven by Nick Sanchez.
 On December 15, 2022, ThorSport Racing revealed that Rich Lushes, who was the crew chief for their No. 99 truck driven by Ben Rhodes in 2021 (where they won the championship) and 2022, would be the crew chief for their No. 13 truck driven by Hailie Deegan in 2023. When it was announced that Deegan's number would be the No. 13, it was replacing the No. 98 truck in ThorSport's lineup of full-time trucks. Jeriod Prince, who was the crew chief of the No. 98 in 2022 (when it was driven by Christian Eckes), will move to the No. 99 to crew chief Rhodes in 2023.  On February 13, 2023, it was announced that driver Ty Majeski and crew chief Joe Shear Jr's No. 66 truck would be renumbered to the No. 98 with the No. 66 becoming a part-time fifth ThorSport truck driven by Conner Jones in 2023.
 On February 3, 2023, it was announced that Jerry Baxter would be the crew chief for the No. 32 Bret Holmes Racing truck in 2023, replacing Shane Huffman. He previously crew chiefed for David Gilliland Racing (now TRICON Garage) on Tanner Gray's No. 15 truck and then Hailie Deegan's No. 1 truck in 2022. On March 3, it was announced that Huffman would be the crew chief and team manager for a new ARCA team, Pinnacle Racing Group, in 2023.
 On February 7, 2023, Niece Motorsports announced that Mike Hillman Jr. would be the crew chief of their No. 41 truck in 2023. He previously crew chiefed for David Gilliland Racing (now TRICON Garage) on Hailie Deegan's No. 1 truck and then Tanner Gray's No. 15 truck in 2022.
 On February 8, 2023, TRICON Garage (previously David Gilliland Racing) announced their 2023 crew chief lineup:
 Scott Zipadelli, previously the crew chief of the No. 16 Hattori truck, will crew chief the team's new No. 11 truck driven by Corey Heim.
 Jerame Donley, who crew chiefed the No. 42 Petty GMS Motorsports (now Legacy Motor Club) car in the Cup Series driven by Ty Dillon in 2022, will crew chief the No. 15 truck driven by Tanner Gray, replacing Mike Hillman Jr, who left to crew chief the Niece Motorsports No. 41 truck.
 Billy Wilburn, who crew chiefed for Penske, Yates Racing and Petty Enterprises in the Cup Series in the 2000s, will crew chief the No. 17 truck, replacing Chad Johnston, who left to crew chief the Stewart-Haas Racing No. 41 car in the Cup Series.
 Brothers Derek and Seth Smith return to the team with Derek crew chiefing the team's new No. 5 truck driven by Dean Thompson and Seth crew chiefing the team's No. 1 truck, replacing Jerry Baxter, who left to crew chief the Bret Holmes Racing No. 32 truck.

Manufacturers
 On September 14, 2022, it was announced that Kyle Busch Motorsports will switch from Toyota to Chevrolet due to team owner Kyle Busch leaving Joe Gibbs Racing (a Toyota team) to drive for Richard Childress Racing, a Chevrolet team, in the Cup Series. The drivers, sponsors and crew chiefs for KBM as well as how many trucks the team will field in 2023 have all yet to be determined.
 On October 5, 2022, Kelly Crandall from RACER Magazine reported that David Gilliland Racing would switch from Ford to Toyota in 2023. The team switched to Ford in 2020 after having previously been a Toyota team in 2018 and 2019. On October 27, DGR officially announced this manufacturer change as well as the team's rebranding to TRICON Garage in 2023.
 On December 15, 2022, ThorSport Racing announced that they would switch from Toyota back to Ford, their manufacturer from 2018 to 2020, in order for Ford development driver Hailie Deegan to drive their No. 13 truck in 2023. (She would replace Christian Eckes, who left the team to drive the No. 19 truck for McAnally-Hilgemann Racing.)
 On January 24, 2023, Reaume Brothers Racing announced that they would switch to Ford in 2023. It is the first time RBR has ever had one manufacturer for each race of the season. The team previously ran a mixture of Chevrolets and Toyotas in the Truck Series since their first season in 2018.

Sponsorship
 On December 1, 2022, TobyChristie.com reported that the Wendell Scott Foundation would sponsor Rajah Caruth and the GMS Racing No. 24 truck for at least part of the 2023 season. Scott was the first African-American driver to win a NASCAR race and Caruth is also an African-American driver.

Potential and rumored changes

Teams
 On July 23, 2022, a fan attending the 2022 ARCA race at Pocono had a conversation with a friend of Stephanie Moyer, who stated that Fast Track Racing might return to the Truck Series in 2023, with Moyer (who has driven for the team in ARCA) driving their truck. Fast Track last fielded a Truck Series team in 2010.

Drivers
 On November 4, 2022, Kyle Busch mentioned during the announcement of Chase Purdy and Jack Wood driving for his team in 2023 that Jimmie Johnson could drive a race for the team in 2023 after the team's switch from Toyota to Chevrolet. (It was announced earlier on the same day that Johnson would return to NASCAR in 2023 as a part-time owner/driver for Petty GMS Motorsports.) The seven-time Cup Series champion has only made one Truck Series start, which came in 2008 at Bristol driving the No. 81 for Randy Moss Motorsports.

Schedule
The entire schedule was released on September 14, 2022.

Note: Race names and title sponsors are subject to change. Not all title sponsors/names of races have been announced for 2023. (New series title sponsor Craftsman will become the title sponsor for the season-finale at Phoenix.) For the races where a 2023 name and title sponsor has yet to be announced, the title sponsors/names of those races in 2022 are listed.

Broadcasting
Fox will air the entirety of the schedule on TV in 2023. It is the second-to-last year of their contract to broadcast the Truck Series on TV which goes through 2024.

Vince Welch, who had been the play-by-play announcer for the Truck Series since 2016, tweeted on December 31, 2022 that he would not be back with Fox in 2023. His replacement has yet to be announced. Adam Alexander, Fox's Xfinity Series play-by-play announcer, is seen as the most likely replacement according to Motorsport.com (he would call the races for both series, although he would likely be unable to call the Gateway race as it clashes with the Portland Xfinity race held on the same day). Jamie Little, a pit reporter and ARCA play-by-play for Fox, is also considered a candidate. She filled in for Welch as play-by-play for the Truck Series race at Knoxville in 2022.

Results and standings

Race results

Drivers' championship

(key) Bold – Pole position awarded by time. Italics – Pole position set by final practice results or owner's points. * – Most laps led. 1 – Stage 1 winner. 2 – Stage 2 winner.

Owners' championship (Top 15)
(key) Bold – Pole position awarded by time. Italics – Pole position set by final practice results or owner's points. * – Most laps led. 1 – Stage 1 winner. 2 – Stage 2 winner.

Manufacturers' championship
After 3 of 23 races

See also
 2023 NASCAR Cup Series
 2023 NASCAR Xfinity Series
 2023 ARCA Menards Series
 2023 ARCA Menards Series East
 2023 ARCA Menards Series West
 2023 NASCAR Pinty's Series
 2023 NASCAR Whelen Euro Series
 2023 SRX Series

References

NASCAR Truck Series seasons
NASCAR Truck
NASCAR Truck
NASCAR Truck